Anatoli Kacharava (15 August, 1910 – 8 May, 1982) was a Soviet and Georgian sea captain serving in the Soviet Navy. He is known for taking part in the arctic theater of the Second World War where he commanded a Soviet icebreaker A. Sibiryakov until its destruction by a German cruiser Admiral Scheer on August 24, 1942. Kacharava was severely wounded but survived, and was one of 22 of the ship's company that were captured by the Germans.

Early life and naval career
Kacharava was born in the summer of 1910 in a coastal town of Sukhumi, Georgia, then part of the Russian Empire. His parents, Aleksei Kacharava and Natalia Kavtaradze, were traders. He received education in several technical and maritime schools, namely Sukhumi Industrial College, Kherson Maritime School and Fishery College of the Far-East. Afterwards, he joined the navy aboard Soviet icebreaker A. Sibiryakov as a senior lieutenant. He was later promoted to a captain during the Second World War.

References
 
 History of Georgian seafaring — Merab Megrelishvili, Shota Makharadze, 2012, Tbilisi
 

1910 births
1982 deaths
People from Sukhumi
Military personnel from Georgia (country)
Recipients of the Order of Lenin
Recipients of the Order of the Red Banner
Recipients of the Order of the Red Banner of Labour
Soviet military personnel of World War II
Soviet Navy personnel
Soviet prisoners of war
World War II prisoners of war held by Germany